Robert Arthur Knox (21 August 1989 – 24 May 2008) was an English actor who portrayed the character of Marcus Belby in the film Harry Potter and the Half-Blood Prince, and had signed to appear in the film Harry Potter and the Deathly Hallows.

Having studied at Beths Grammar School, Bexley, Knox began acting aged 11, gaining small roles in British television shows like The Bill, After You've Gone and Trust Me, I'm a Teenager. His first cinematic appearance was as an extra in King Arthur (2004).

Knox died after being stabbed outside a bar in Sidcup, Southeast London, in May 2008, when he intervened in a fight to protect his brother. His murder attracted widespread attention in the British press, and his assailant, Karl Norman Bishop, was subsequently sentenced to life imprisonment, with a minimum 20-year non-parole period.

Early life and career
Knox was born to Colin and Sally Knox in 1989. He was a pupil at Beths Grammar School, Bexley. He had been acting since the age of 11, and his first credited role was a small part in an episode of the ITV police drama The Bill and he also appeared in the Channel 4 reality show Trust Me, I'm a Teenager, and the BBC comedy After You've Gone. He had previously appeared as an extra in a number of productions. The first film Knox appeared in was King Arthur in 2004. He also appeared on Tonight with Trevor McDonald.

Harry Potter
In 2007, casting began for the role of Marcus Belby in Harry Potter and the Half-Blood Prince, the film adaptation of British author J. K. Rowling's best-selling novel and the sixth installment of the Harry Potter film series.

Knox posthumously appeared in Harry Potter and the Half-Blood Prince (2009).

Although his character does not appear in the seventh novel, Knox had signed on to reprise his role as Marcus Belby in the final installment of the Harry Potter film series, Harry Potter and the Deathly Hallows. The film was divided into two parts for financial and scripting reasons; Part 1 was released in November 2010, with the second part in July 2011.

Death

Murder
Knox died at the age of 18 after he was stabbed outside the Metro Bar in Sidcup, Southeast London, on 24 May 2008. He had intervened in a fight to protect his 17-year-old brother Jamie, who was being threatened by a man armed with two kitchen knives. Warner Bros. released a statement concerning his death: "We are all shocked and saddened by this news and at this time our sympathies are with his family".

Arrest and trial of Karl Bishop
Karl Norman Bishop (born 1987 in Lewisham, Southeast London), from Carlton Road, Sidcup, was charged with the murder. He was taken into custody, and remained there until his trial, which began in February 2009. Bishop was found guilty of murder on 4 March 2009, and received a life sentence with a minimum of 20 years before being considered for parole. Police reported that he showed no remorse for the crime.

Filmography

See also
 Murder of Ben Kinsella - Kinsella was another child actor who was stabbed to death in 2008 whist still a teenager
 Sally Anne Bowman - a British model who was also murdered in London whist still a teenager

References

External links

Robert Knox Foundation

1989 births
2008 crimes in the United Kingdom
2008 deaths
2008 in London
Deaths by stabbing in London
English male film actors
English murder victims
People from Medway
People from Sidcup
People murdered in London
People educated at Beths Grammar School
Male actors from Kent
21st-century English male actors
English male child actors